Harvey Epstein is an American politician from the state of New York. He is the member of the New York State Assembly from the 74th district, which consists parts of the Lower East Side, East Village, and Midtown East neighborhoods of Manhattan.

Epstein won a special election to succeed Brian P. Kavanagh, who was elected to the New York State Senate, in 2018.

Legislation

Assemblyman Epstein sponsored legislation to reform the New York State Real Property Law and Tax Law in regards to mezzanine financing.  The legislation calls for 
the recording of mezzanine debt and preferred equity investments and subject it to the mortgage recording tax. These amendments will force borrowers and lenders to reconsider the economic costs of mezzanine financing.
It was introduced on January 22, 2021.

References

External links

Living people
Politicians from New York City
People from Manhattan
Ithaca College alumni
CUNY School of Law alumni
Democratic Party members of the New York State Assembly
21st-century American politicians
1967 births